Andy Scharmin (29 November 1967 – 7 June 1989) was a Dutch footballer. During his career he served FC Twente. He died at the age of 21, when on 7 June 1989 he was killed in the Surinam Airways Flight PY764 air crash in Paramaribo. He was the captain of the Netherlands U-21 team. His mother was from Suriname, while his father was German.

Biography
Born in Paramaribo, Scharmin lived and grew up in Haaksbergen and played his first football at VV Haaksbergen. A few years later he was scouted by FC Twente and joined the youth squads of that team. He was known as a social guy and a talented player with a great future ahead of him. He made his professional debut for FC Twente on 16 October 1987 in the home match against Willem II Tilburg which was won 1–0. It didn't take Scharmin long to convince his coaches to become a first team regular. Manager Theo Vonk brought him in the squad as a midfielder, but during the season he was lined-up as a left back and became a fan favourite and a delight for the eye. He was very fast, never failed in his determination to win and always managed to do what the coach was asking for.

Also in Zeist, where the Royal Dutch Football Association is located his talents were notified. He was called up for the Netherlands U-21 team and even became captain. In a combination match of the under-21s and the Netherlands national football team against the Germany national football team Scharmin fooled German football legend Franz Beckenbauer. After the confrontation between the younger sides of the countries the players would take place on the stands to watch the national sides play each other in a friendly. In the changing rooms Scharmin saw a uniform of a stadium official and dressed himself up in the outfit. Soon after that Franz Beckenbauer arrived on his way to the stands and Scharmin who spoke fluent German asked Beckenbauer for his ticket. Beckenbauer was unable to show his ticket and Scharmin did not let him through. This became a very emotional incident that was eventually solved.

On 11 December 1988 FC Twente played a memorable match against Feyenoord Rotterdam, one of the giant teams in the Netherlands. Scharmin featured in the match that was won in style, 6–1. At the end of the 1988–89 season he was invited by Sonny Hasnoe, the founder of the Colourful 11 to be part of the team and travel to Suriname to play in the "Boxel Kleurrijk Tournament" with three Surinamese teams. He also was selected for the Dutch Under-21 team to represent them at the Toulon Tournament. Several people, including manager Vonk advised him to go to Toulon, but Scharmin knew that his mother had not been back to Suriname in 40 years and decided to join the Colourful 11. Together with his mother and aunt he boarded the airplane and went to Suriname. The Surinam Airways Flight PY764 crashed during approach to Paramaribo-Zanderij International Airport, killing 176 of the 187 on board, including Scharmin and both his mother and aunt, making it the worst ever aviation disaster in Suriname's history. Among the dead were a total of 15 members of the Colourful 11, only three of them survived.

Shortly after the accident FC Twente played a friendly match against FC Barcelona in memoriam of Scharmin. The city of Haaksbergen, the place where Scharmin lived awards the Andy Scharmin Trophy every year to the most talented sportsperson of the city.

Media
 Video of Andy Scharmin against Roda JC. (FC Twente.nl)
 Video of FC Twente- Feyenoord Rotterdam (6-1). (FC Twente.nl)

References
 Scharmin at FC Twente.nl 
 Scharmin at AndroKnel.nl 
 Scharmin in the 6-1 win over Feyenoord 
 Crash report
 Iwan Tol: Eindbesteming Zanderij; het vergeten verhaal van het Kleurrijk Elftal 

1967 births
1989 deaths
Association football fullbacks
Dutch footballers
Dutch sportspeople of Surinamese descent
Dutch people of German descent
Eredivisie players
FC Twente players
Netherlands under-21 international footballers
People from Haaksbergen
Footballers from Overijssel
Footballers killed in the Surinam Airways Flight 764 crash